Mæla is a village in the municipality of Rana in Nordland county, Norway.

The district surrounding the inner part of the Sjona fjord originally belonged to the municipality of Nesna.  On 1 January 1964, this district (population: 543) was merged with the town of Mo i Rana, the municipality of Nord-Rana, and the northern part of Sør-Rana to create the new municipality of Rana.

References

Villages in Nordland
Rana, Norway